Greg Stumon (born May 26, 1963) is a former award-winning defensive end and linebacker who played the Canadian Football League.

A native of Plain Dealing, Louisiana, he attended the Southern Arkansas University, and was inducted into that school's Sports Hall of Fame in 2003.

He began his CFL career with the BC Lions in 1986, playing until 1988. He won the CFL's Most Outstanding Defensive Player Award in 1987.  He made the 1987 all-star team as a defensive end and the 1988 all-star team as an outside linebacker. After one season with the Edmonton Eskimos (1989) he moved on to the Ottawa Rough Riders (1990–92) where he made the 1990 all-star team as a defensive end. He later played with the expansion Shreveport Pirates for 1994 and 1995.

He trialled with the Dallas Cowboys in 1990 but was cut before the season started.

References

1963 births
Living people
People from Plain Dealing, Louisiana
BC Lions players
Canadian football defensive linemen
Canadian football linebackers
Edmonton Elks players
Ottawa Rough Riders players
Shreveport Pirates players
Canadian Football League Most Outstanding Defensive Player Award winners
Southern Arkansas Muleriders football players